Sir William Coke (1776 – 1 September 1818) was a Puisne Justice of the Supreme Court of Ceylon as well as acting as Provisional Chief Justice of Ceylon and the fourth Advocate Fiscal of Ceylon.

Coke arrived in Ceylon on 15 September 1808. He was appointed on 5 September 1808, succeeding James Dunkin, and held the office until 1811. He was succeeded by Ambrose Hardinge Giffard.

Coke died of dysentery when in Trincomalee for a Criminal Session.

References

External links
 Coke, Sir William (c 1776-1818) Knight Chief Justice of Ceylon

Attorneys General of British Ceylon
Puisne Justices of the Supreme Court of Ceylon
British Ceylon judges
1776 births
1818 deaths